Bodibeng is a village in North-West District of Botswana. It is located in the southern part of the district, close to the Okavango Delta and Lake Ngami, and has a primary school. The population was 472 in 2001 census.

References

North-West District (Botswana)
Villages in Botswana